is a football manager and former Japanese football player. 
He formerly managed The Philippines, Guam and Northern Mariana Islands national teams.

Club career
Kambe was born in Shizuoka Prefecture on August 2, 1961. After graduating from Waseda University, he played for Honda from 1984 to 1990.

Futsal career
In 1989, Kambe selected Japan national futsal team for 1989 Futsal World Championship in Netherlands.

Coaching career
After retirement, Kambe started coaching career at Honda in 1990. In 1991, he moved to Furukawa Electric (later JEF United Chiba)and he coached until 2001. He also managed the club as caretaker in 2000 and 2001. From 2002, he managed national teams, Philippines (2002-2003), Guam (2003-2005) and Northern Mariana Islands (2009). In 2010, he returned to JEF United Chiba. In October 2011, he became a manager as Dwight Lodeweges successor. From 2013, he went to Thailand and managed Thai clubs.

Managerial statistics

Manager Honours
 Thai Division 1 League Winner: 2014

References

External links

Kambe to coach Northern Mariana Islands

1961 births
Living people
Waseda University alumni
Association football people from Shizuoka Prefecture
Japanese footballers
Japanese men's futsal players
Japan Soccer League players
Honda FC players
Japanese football managers
J1 League managers
J2 League managers
JEF United Chiba managers
Expatriate football managers in Guam
Guam national football team managers
Expatriate football managers in the Northern Mariana Islands
Northern Mariana Islands national football team managers
Expatriate football managers in the Philippines
Philippines national football team managers
Sugao Kambe
Association footballers not categorized by position
Japanese expatriate football managers
Japanese expatriate sportspeople in Guam
Japanese expatriate sportspeople in the Philippines
Japanese expatriate sportspeople in the Northern Mariana Islands
Sugao Kambe